The upland moa (Megalapteryx didinus) was a species of moa endemic to New Zealand. It was a ratite, a grouping of flightless birds with no keel on the sternum. It was the last moa species to become extinct, vanishing in 1445 CE, and was predominantly found in alpine and sub-alpine environments.

Taxonomy
In 2005, a genetic study suggested that M. benhami, which had previously been considered a junior synonym of M. didinus, may have been a valid species after all.

The cladogram below follows a 2009 analysis by Bunce et al.:

Description
 
Unlike other moas, it had feathers covering all of its body but the beak and the soles of its feet, an adaptation to its cold environment. 
Scientists believed in the past that the upland moa held its neck and head upright; however, it actually carried itself in a stooped posture with its head level to its back. This would have helped it travel through the abundant vegetation in its habitat, whereas an extended neck would have been more suited to open spaces. It had no wings or tail.

Distribution and habitat
The upland moa lived only on New Zealand's South Island, in mountains and sub-alpine regions. They travelled to elevations as high as 2000 m (7000 ft).

Behavior and ecology
 
The upland moa was herbivorous, its diet extrapolated from fossilised stomach contents, droppings, and the structure of its beak and crop. It ate leaves and small twigs, using its beak to "shear ... with scissor-like moves". Its food required grinding before it could be digested, as indicated by its large crop. A 2004 study of the upland moa's coprolite provided evidence that branchlets of trees such as Nothofagus, various lake-edge herbs, and tussock made up part of its diet.
This moa usually laid only 1 to 2 blue-green coloured eggs at once, and was likely the only type of moa to lay eggs that were not white in colour. Like the emu and ostrich, male moa cared for the young. The upland moa's only predator before the arrival of humans in New Zealand was the Haast's eagle.

Extinction
Humans first came in contact with the upland moa around 1250 to 1300 AD, when the Māori people arrived in New Zealand from Polynesia. Moa, a docile animal, were an easy source of food for the Māori and were eventually hunted to extinction in 1445.

Discoveries
 
Several specimens with soft tissue and feather remains are known: 
British Museum A16, found at Queenstown in 1876, is the type of the species.
Otago Museum C.68.2A, leg with much muscle tissue, skin and feathers from the Old Man Range
Museum of New Zealand Te Papa Tongarewa NMNZ S.000400, a skeleton with tissue on neck and head from the Cromwell area.
Museum of New Zealand Te Papa Tongarewa NMNZ S.023080, a foot with some muscle and sinews, found on 7 January 1987 at Mount Owen. This was dated to be about 3,300–3,400 years old.
Museum of New Zealand Te Papa Tongarewa NMNZ S.027950, feathers found in 1949 at Takahe Valley, Fiordland, New Zealand.
Canterbury Museum NZ 1725, Remains of one partial egg which have been found at the Rakaia River in 1971 are tentatively attributed to this species. The radiocarbon date of approximately AD 1300–1400 is in line with this. Unusually, the eggshell is dark olive green, but even if the egg is of M. didinus, the shell colour may have varied between individual eggs.
Museum of New Zealand Te Papa Tongarewa NMNZ S.023700, complete skeleton found by Trevor Worthy in March 1987 at Honeycomb Hill Cave, Oparara Valley
Otago Museum AV10049, skeleton and partial egg found in 2002 at Serpentine Range, Humboldt Mountains.

Footnotes

References

External links

 
 
Upland Moa. Megalapteryx didinus. by Paul Martinson. Artwork produced for the book Extinct Birds of New Zealand by Alan Tennyson, Te Papa Press, Wellington, 2006
Articulated skeleton at the Museum of New Zealand Te Papa Tongarewa
Articulated Upland moa skeleton at the Otago Museum

upland moa
Birds of the South Island
Extinct flightless birds
Extinct birds of New Zealand
Bird extinctions since 1500
Late Quaternary prehistoric birds
Ratites
upland moa
Species made extinct by human activities